According to The Oregonian, 18,000 (7.5 percent) of the Portland metropolitan area's 135,000 Asian/Pacific residents live along 82nd Avenue, in an area dubbed New Chinatown, as of 2012.

Old Town Chinatown features the Lan Su Chinese Garden.

Organizations

There is a Portland chapter of the Chinese American Citizens Alliance.

Restaurants
Chinese restaurants have included Ambassador Restaurant and Lounge, Bing Mi, Chin's Kitchen, Duck House Chinese Restaurant, Fong Chong, Frank's Noodle House, Gado Gado, HK Cafe, House of Louie, Hunan Restaurant, Kenny's Noodle House, Master Kong, Ocean City Seafood Restaurant, The Pagoda, Republic Cafe and Ming Lounge, Shandong, Shanghai's Best, Stretch the Noodle, Wei Wei, Wong's King, and XLB.

See also
 Chinese American women's suffrage in Oregon
 Da Tung and Xi'an Bao Bao
 Ethnic groups in Portland, Oregon
 Hispanics and Latinos in Portland, Oregon
 History of Korean Americans in Portland, Oregon
 History of the Japanese in Portland, Oregon
 National University of Natural Medicine
 Oregon College of Oriental Medicine

References

External links

 Chinese American Culture at Travel Portland
 6 Portlanders' family stories of exclusion for being Chinese, The Oregonian

 
Chinese-American history
History of Portland, Oregon